
Laguna Ventarrón  a lake in the Ixiamas Municipality, Abel Iturralde Province, La Paz Department, Bolivia. At an elevation of 185 m, its surface area is 2.5 km2.

References 

Lakes of Pando Department